Malaysia competed in the 2013 Asian Youth Games held in Nanjing, China from 16 to 24 August 2013. Malaysia won a total of 17 medals, including 4 golds, 6 silvers and 7 bronzes. It earned eighth position in the medal table.

Medallists

3-on-3 basketball

Boys' tournament
Group D

 

 
Quarterfinals

 
Fifth to eighth place classification

 
Fifth and sixth place classification

 
Fifth in final standings

Athletics

 
Boys
Track event

 
Field events

 
Girls
Track event

 
Field events

Badminton

Diving

 
Boys

 
Girls

Fencing

Golf

Boys

Girls

Judo

Boys

 
Girls

Shooting

Squash

Swimming

 
Boys

 
Girls

Table tennis

Taekwondo

Boys

Weightlifting

Boys

References

Malaysia at the Asian Games
Malaysia
2013 in Malaysian sport